Hwang Byung-dae (born 14 November 1960) is a South Korean skier. He competed in the 20 km individual event at the 1984 Winter Olympics.

References

External links
 

1960 births
Living people
South Korean male biathletes
South Korean male cross-country skiers
Olympic biathletes of South Korea
Olympic cross-country skiers of South Korea
Biathletes at the 1984 Winter Olympics
Cross-country skiers at the 1980 Winter Olympics
Place of birth missing (living people)
Asian Games medalists in biathlon
Biathletes at the 1986 Asian Winter Games
Asian Games bronze medalists for South Korea
Medalists at the 1986 Asian Winter Games
20th-century South Korean people
21st-century South Korean people